The Lieutenant Governor of Jammu and Kashmir is the head of the Indian union territory of Jammu and Kashmir.

The office of lieutenant governor was established after an Act was passed in August 2019 in the Parliament of India, reorganising the state of Jammu and Kashmir into two union territories; Jammu and Kashmir and Ladakh on 31 October 2019. Provisions contained within the act created the positions of Lieutenant Governor of Jammu and Kashmir and Lieutenant Governor of Ladakh.

Lieutenant Governors of Jammu and Kashmir

See also
List of current Indian lieutenant governors and administrators
List of governors of Jammu and Kashmir

References

External links
 India
 Raj Bhawan J&K

Lieutenant Governors
Lists of governors of Indian states